Malegaon Ka Chintu is an Indian silent comedy series which premiered on SAB TV. The series is produced by Deepti Bhatnagar.The first season premiered on 6 August 2010 and concluded on 26 March 2011.the story revolves around a character named Chintu.

Overview

Season 1
The story portrays the life of a small-town boy, Chintu (character loosely based on Mr. Bean), whose life revolves around his coat, his bicycle and his girlfriend, Pinky. They go all over the world and get caught up in hilarious situations, sometimes of Chintu's doings.

Season 2
The second season named Chintu Ban Gaya Gentleman premiered on 15 December 2012 and concluded on 6 July 2013. It takes the eventful life of Chintu from the villages of Malegaon straight to exotic locales around the globe

Season 3
A third season Chintu Aur Pintu premiered on 27 September 2014 and concluded on 30 November 2014.

Cast
Al Amin Shaikh as Chintu
Al Dakin Sing as Pintu
Ashwini Khairnar as Pinky, Chintu's Girlfriend

References

External links
Official Site on SAB TV

Sony SAB original programming
Indian comedy television series
2010 Indian television series debuts
2011 Indian television series endings
Television shows set in Maharashtra